Paul Graham is an American novelist.

He graduated from St. Lawrence University summa cum laude with a BA, and from the University of Michigan with an MFA Program in 2001.
He teaches at St. Lawrence University.

Awards
 2005 Dana Award, Novel: A Trained Voice

Works
 
 
 Crazy Season
 Visitation
 On the Funeral Trail
 Ring of Silance
 Snow in Summer
 Thin Boundaries
 Slider
 Risk Management
 Two Lives
 Safe House
 Furlough

References

External links
  
 

21st-century American novelists
St. Lawrence University alumni
University of Michigan alumni
Living people
American male novelists
Year of birth missing (living people)
21st-century American male writers